HMS Falcon was a Fairfield three-funnel, 30 knot destroyer ordered by the Royal Navy under the 1898 – 1899 Naval Estimates.  She spent her life in Home waters, was part of the Dover Patrol during World War I and was lost in a collision on 1 April 1918.

Construction and career
She was laid down as yard number 412 on 26 June 1899 at the Fairfield Shipbuilding and Engineering Company shipyard at Govan, Glasgow and launched on 29 December 1899.  During her builder's trials she made her contracted speed requirement.  She was completed and accepted by the Royal Navy in December 1901.

She spent her operational career only in home waters operating with the Channel Fleet.

Falcon was commissioned at Devonport on 4 January 1902 and was assigned to the Channel Fleet to serve in the instructional flotilla at Portsmouth. Commander Roger Keyes was appointed in command, bringing the crew of the destroyer , which previously served in the flotilla. She paid off at Devonport on 12 May 1902, when her crew transferred to the destroyer , which was the following day commissioned for the instructional flotilla. She was recommissioned on 22 November to take the place of HMS Skate in the Devonport instructional flotilla, and received the crew from that ship.

On 11 April 1907 Falcon and the destroyer  collided in the Channel, badly damaging both ships. Falcon was under repair for almost three months. On 9 July 1907 Falcon towed the destroyer  back to the Nore after Violet was badly damaged in a collision with a sailing vessel.

On 30 August 1912 the Admiralty directed all destroyer classes were to be designated by alphabetic characters starting with the letter 'A'.  Since her design speed was 30-knots and she had three funnels she was assigned to the C class.  After 30 September 1913 she was known as a C-class destroyer and had the letter ‘C’ painted on the hull below the bridge area and on either the fore or aft funnel.

World War I
For the test mobilization in July 1914, she was assigned to the 6th Destroyer Flotilla based at Dover.  While employed with the 6th Flotilla, she conducted counter-mining patrols escorted merchant ships and patrolled in defense of the Dover Barrage.

On 28 October 1914 while on anti-submarine patrol off the Belgian coast at Westende with Syren she came under heavy accurate artillery fire from the shore. She remained on station and returned fire until hit by an  shell which killed 8 personnel including her commanding officer and wounded 15.  She was brought into Dunkirk and repaired. She was awarded the battle honour "Belgian Coast 1914 – 17" for her service.

On 1 April 1918, while on convoy duty in the North Sea and under the command of C.H. Lightoller, she was rammed and sunk by the armed trawler HMS John Fitzgerald

Pennant numbers

Notes

Bibliography
 
 
 
 
 
 
 
 
 
 
 

 

Ships built in Govan
1899 ships
C-class destroyers (1913)
World War I destroyers of the United Kingdom
Maritime incidents in 1918
Ships sunk in collisions
World War I shipwrecks in the North Sea